Giovanni Canova (28 August 1895 – 7 September 1983) was an Italian racing cyclist. He rode in the 1924 Tour de France.

References

1895 births
1983 deaths
Italian male cyclists
Place of birth missing